Charax stenopterus is a small species of South American fish in the genus Charax.

Description 
In the wild, Charax stenopterus usually grows to about 9.4 cm.

Distribution and habitat 
Charax stenopterus usually lives in the rivers of South America.

See also 

 Glass headstander
 Hyphessobrycon
 Hemigrammus

References

Characidae
Freshwater fish of South America
Taxa named by Edward Drinker Cope